Riksa Islands (‘Ostrovi Riksa’ \'os-trovi 'ri-ksa\) are three adjacent ice-free islands in the Aitcho group on the west side of English Strait in the South Shetland Islands, Antarctica. The area was visited by early 19th century sealers.

The group comprises the islands of Cricklewood, Taunton and Bath.

Riksa Islands are named after the settlements of Kamenna (Stone) Riksa and Lower Riksa in northwestern Bulgaria. Criclewood Island is named after the district of London where the main part of the UKHO was located until 1968. Taunton Island is named after the town of Taunton in England, where the UKHO printing works has been located since 1941 and where the remainder of the Office moved in 1968. Bath Island is named after the city of Bath in England, where sections of the UKHO were temporarily located during World War II.

Location
Bulgarian mapping in 2009.

See also 
 Composite Gazetteer of Antarctica
 List of Antarctic islands south of 60° S
 SCAR
 Territorial claims in Antarctica

Map
 L.L. Ivanov. Antarctica: Livingston Island and Greenwich, Robert, Snow and Smith Islands. Scale 1:120000 topographic map. Troyan: Manfred Wörner Foundation, 2010.  (First edition 2009. )
 Antarctic Digital Database (ADD). Scale 1:250000 topographic map of Antarctica. Scientific Committee on Antarctic Research (SCAR). Since 1993, regularly upgraded and updated.
 L.L. Ivanov. Antarctica: Livingston Island and Smith Island. Scale 1:100000 topographic map. Manfred Wörner Foundation, 2017.

Notes

References
 Bulgarian Antarctic Gazetteer. Antarctic Place-names Commission. (details in Bulgarian, basic data in English)

External links
 Riksa Islands. Copernix satellite image

Islands of the South Shetland Islands
Bulgaria and the Antarctic